Venus Equilateral is a collection of science fiction short stories by American writer  George O. Smith. The stories belong to Smith's Venus Equilateral series. The collection was first published in 1947 by Prime Press in an edition of 3,000 copies. "Mad Holiday" was written for this collection. The other stories first appeared in the magazine Astounding.

Contents

 Introduction, by John W. Campbell, Jr.
 "QRM—Interplanetary"
 "Calling the Empress"
 "Recoil"
 "Off the Beam"
 "The Long Way"
 "Beam Pirate"
 "Firing Line"
 "Special Delivery"
 "Pandora’s Millions"
 "Mad Holiday"
 "The External Triangle"
 "Epilogue: Identity"

References

Sources

External links
 

1947 short story collections
Science fiction short story collections